Williams International is an American manufacturer of small gas turbine engines based in Pontiac, Michigan, United States. It produces jet engines for cruise missiles and small jet aircraft.

History 
Dr. Sam B. Williams worked at Chrysler on their automotive turbine systems, but always imagined a wider set of applications for the small gas turbine engine. He left Chrysler to form Williams Research Corporation in Birmingham, Michigan, in 1954. In 1981, the company became Williams International. It has been building small turbofan engines since the 1950s for use in cruise missiles as well as target and reconnaissance drones.

Using the missile engines, Williams developed a series of personal VTOL flying craft, including a jet-powered belt in 1969, the Williams Aerial Systems Platform (WASP), also known as the "flying pulpit" in the 1970s, and the X-Jet, which was evaluated by the United States Army in the 1980s.  The WASP platform was the only competitor to the Garrett STAMP in the United States Marine Corps STAMP (Small Tactical Aerial Mobility Platform) program of the early 1970s.

Also in the 1980s, Williams identified a need in the general aviation market for a small, light jet engine to power cost-effective personal and corporate jet aircraft. The company introduced the FJ44 engine, which in turn made possible the introduction of a number of small jet aircraft.

In 1992, NASA initiated its Advanced General Aviation Transport Experiments (AGATE) program to partner with manufacturers and help develop technologies that would revitalize the sagging general aviation industry. In 1996, Williams joined AGATE's General Aviation Propulsion program to develop a fuel-efficient turbofan engine that would be even smaller than the FJ44. The result was the FJX-2 engine. Williams then contracted with Burt Rutan's Scaled Composites to design and build the Williams V-Jet II, a Very Light Jet to use as a testbed and technology demonstrator to showcase the new engine. The aircraft and engine were debuted at the 1997 Oshkosh Airshow. The production version of the engine, the EJ22 flew on the prototype Eclipse 500 VLJ (which had evolved from the V-Jet II), but was subsequently replaced by a Pratt & Whitney engine.

Products

Aircraft

Engines

See also
 EV1 Series Hybrid, a gas turbine hybrid vehicle prototype
 Chrysler turbine engines

References

Notes

Bibliography

External links
 

Aircraft engine manufacturers of the United States
Companies based in Oakland County, Michigan
Privately held companies of the United States